"When the World Screamed" is a science fiction short story by British writer Arthur Conan Doyle, featuring his character Professor Challenger.  It was first published in Liberty magazine, from 25 February to 3 March 1928.

It is narrated in first person by Mr. Peerless Jones, an expert in Artesian borings who is seen for the first time.

It is the fourth Professor Challenger story and retains only Challenger and Malone from the first novel.

Plot summary
Professor Challenger, with the help of Mr Edward Malone and Mr Peerless Jones, drills into the earth until he reaches the mantle, convinced that it is a sentient being, akin to an echinus, and that by doing so he will be the first person to alert it to mankind's presence. He awakens the giant creature, which then proceeds to destroy his excavation, covering the spectators with a noxious liquid in the process.

See also 
 1928 in science fiction
 The Lost World (1912 Conan Doyle novel)
 The Poison Belt
 The Land of Mist
 "The Disintegration Machine"

External links
When the World Screamed at the Classic Literature Library
When the World Screamed audiobook with video at YouTube
When the World Screamed audiobook at Libsyn

References 

1928 short stories
Professor Challenger short stories
Science fiction short stories
Works originally published in Liberty (general interest magazine)